Blue Ridge is an unincorporated community and census-designated place (CDP) in Elmore County, Alabama, United States. At the 2020 census, the population was 1,485. It is part of the Montgomery Metropolitan Statistical Area.

Geography
Blue Ridge is located in southern Elmore County at  (32.486744, -86.190823). It is bordered to the west by Wetumpka, the county seat, and to the southeast by Redland.

Demographics

As of the census of 2000, there were 1,331 people, 511 households, and 436 families residing in the CDP. The racial makeup of the CDP was 95.79% White, 3.08% Black or African American, 0.38% Native American, 0.30% Asian, 0.08% Pacific Islander, and 0.38% from two or more races. 0.53% of the population were Hispanic or Latino of any race.

There were 511 households, out of which 30.7% had children under the age of 18 living with them, 0.0% were married couples living together, 6.5% had a female householder with no husband present, and 14.5% were non-families. 13.1% of all households were made up of individuals, and 5.3% had someone living alone who was 65 years of age or older. The average household size was 2.60 and the average family size was 2.84.

In the CDP, the population was spread out, with 22.2% under the age of 18, 4.7% from 18 to 24, 21.0% from 25 to 44, 37.6% from 45 to 64, and 14.6% who were 65 years of age or older. The median age was 46 years. For every 100 females, there were 101.4 males. For every 100 females age 18 and over, there were 94.4 males.

The median income for a household in the CDP was $73,162, and the median income for a family was $83,320. Males had a median income of $60,625 versus $37,875 for females. The per capita income for the CDP was $32,774. None of the families and 1.1% of the population were living below the poverty line, including no under eighteens and none of those over 64.

2010 census
As of the census of 2010, there were 1,341 people, 556 households, and 436 families residing in the CDP. The racial makeup of the CDP was 94.5% White, 2.7% Black or African American, 0.7% Native American, 0.9% Asian, 0.1% Pacific Islander, and 0.9% from two or more races. 1.0% of the population were Hispanic or Latino of any race.

There were 556 households, out of which 20.0% had children under the age of 18 living with them, 70.9% were married couples living together, 5.2% had a female householder with no husband present, and 21.6% were non-families. 19.6% of all households were made up of individuals, and 7.9% had someone living alone who was 65 years of age or older. The average household size was 2.41 and the average family size was 2.73.

In the CDP, the population was spread out, with 16.6% under the age of 18, 5.2% from 18 to 24, 15.0% from 25 to 44, 41.2% from 45 to 64, and 22.0% who were 65 years of age or older. The median age was 52.7 years. For every 100 females, there were 99.3 males. For every 100 females age 18 and over, there were 93.2 males.

The median income for a household in the CDP was $84,135, and the median income for a family was $85,066. Males had a median income of $69,141 versus $46,029 for females. The per capita income for the CDP was $40,625. None of the families and 0% of the population were living below the poverty line, including no under eighteens and none of those over 64.

Education
It is in the Elmore County Public School System.

References

External links
Elmore County Economic Development Authority (ECEDA)

Census-designated places in Elmore County, Alabama
Census-designated places in Alabama
Unincorporated communities in Alabama
Montgomery metropolitan area